The Princess Place Preserve (also known as Cherokee Grove) is a historic site in Palm Coast, Florida. It is located between SR A1A (Florida) and I-95, on Pellicer Creek, just south of the St. Johns/Flagler county line. On May 2, 1997, it was added to the U.S. National Register of Historic Places.

References

External links
 Flagler County listings at National Register of Historic Places
 Florida's Office of Cultural and Historical Programs
 Flagler County listings
 Flagler County markers
 Princess Place Preserve

Buildings and structures in Flagler County, Florida
Parks on the National Register of Historic Places in Florida
National Register of Historic Places in Flagler County, Florida